Kutumba Assembly constituency is an assembly constituency for Bihar Legislative Assembly in Aurangabad district, Bihar. It comes under Aurangabad (Bihar Lok Sabha constituency), along with other assembly constituencies viz Rafiganj, Aurangabad, Gurua, Imamganj and Tikari.

Members of Legislative Assembly

Election Results

2020

References

External links
 

Assembly constituencies of Bihar